Salvia farinacea, the mealycup sage, or mealy sage, is a herbaceous perennial native to Nuevo León, Mexico and parts of the United States including Texas and Oklahoma. Violet-blue spikes rest on a compact plant of typically narrow salvia-like leaves; however, the shiny leaves are what set this species apart from most other Salvia, which bear velvety-dull leaves.

Description
The mealycup sage reaches stature heights of 60 to 90 cm. The shape of the leaf blade varies from ovate-lanceolate to lanceolate. The inflorescence axis forms a blue, rarely a white hair. The truncated calyx has very short calyx teeth. They are dense blue or white hairy, so that the individual enamel teeth are barely recognisable. The bright blue-white flowers are slim and gleaming. The crown will be about 2.5 inches long. Inside the crown there is no ring-shaped hair strip.

The first description of S. farinacea was made in 1833 by George Bentham in Labiatarum Genera et Species, p. 274. Synonyms for S. farinacea Benth. include Salvia linearis Sessé & Moc. and S. virgata Ortega.

Cultivation 
This plant requires full or partial sun and will grow to 18 inches or more with good soil and will attract butterflies and hummingbirds. The plant is hardy to USDA Hardiness Zones 8–10. The plant flowers from June to frost.  In the temperate latitudes, it is cultivated as an annual plant and used as an ornamental plant in parks and gardens, especially in summer discounts. It can also be used as a cut flower.

Several cultivars are cultivated, such as 'Blue Bedder', 'Victoria' with intense violet-blue flowers and 'Strata' with white and blue flowers. Crosses between S. farinacea and S. longispicata (S. longispicata × S. farinacea) are widely sold as ornamental plants, such as 'Indigo Spires' and 'Mystic Spires Blue'.

Cultivars
S. farinacea 'Blue Bedder'
S. farinacea 'Strata'
S. farinacea 'Victoria'
Salvia Indigo Spires (S. longispicata × S. farinacea)
Salvia Mystic Spires Blue (S. longispicata × S. farinacea)

Gallery

References

External links
USDA Plants Profile

farinacea
Plants described in 1833
Flora of Oklahoma
Flora of Texas
Flora of Nuevo León
Flora without expected TNC conservation status